The current Constitution of France does not specify a national emblem. The unofficial coat of arms of France depicts a lictor's fasces upon branches of laurel and oak, as well as a ribbon bearing the national motto of Liberté, égalité, fraternité. This composition was created in 1905 by heraldic painter-engraver Maurice de Meyère and was first used by the French Third Republic.

The full achievement includes the star and grand collar of the Legion of Honour.

Devices
The blazoning is:

Coat of arms: charges

Motto

Liberté, égalité, fraternité ("liberty, equality, fraternity", is the national motto of France, and is an example of a tripartite motto. Although it finds its origins in the French Revolution, it was then only one motto among others and was not institutionalized until the Third Republic at the end of the 19th century.

Fasces

Fasces are a bundle of birch rods containing a sacrificial axe. In Roman times, the fasces symbolized the power of magistrates, representing union and accord with the Roman Republic. French architects began to use the Roman fasces (faisceaux romains) as a decorative device during the reign of Louis XIII (1610–1643), and the imagery of the French Revolution used references to the ancient Roman Republic to an even greater extent. During the First Republic, topped by the Phrygian cap, the fasces is a tribute to the Roman Republic and means that power belongs to the people. It also symbolizes the "unity and indivisibility of the Republic", as stated in the French Constitution.

Branches

The oak is France's national tree, and a common symbol of strength and endurance.
A bay laurel branch, an aromatic broadleaf evergreen, or later from spineless butcher's broom (Ruscus hypoglossum) or cherry laurel (Prunus laurocerasus). It is a symbol of triumph, which traces back to Greek mythology. Apollo is represented wearing a laurel wreath on his head, and wreaths were awarded to victors in athletic competitions, including the ancient Olympics — for which they were made of wild olive-tree known as "kotinos", (sc. at Olympia)—and in poetic meets. In Rome they were symbols of martial victory, crowning a successful commander during his triumph.

External devices

Star and grand collar of the Legion of Honour, which is the highest French order of merit for military and civil merits, established in 1802 by Napoleon Bonaparte and retained by all later French governments and régimes. The achievement includes the order's grand collar, which is worn only by the President, as Grand Master of the order.

History

Background

13th century – 1870: Arms of dominion / French revolution

French kings and emperors had personal arms of dominion, which by extension also represented France. The fleur-de-lis was used by French kings since the Middle Ages, which were followed by the Napoleonic eagle designs after the French Revolution. The fleur-de-lis is still popular, and used by overseas people of French heritage, like the Acadians, Québécois or Cajuns. The Napoleonic eagle is also used by Swedish royal house.

1870–1905: Period without any national coat of arms

The state was left without a coat of arms after the proclamation of the Third Republic in 1870. Consequently, the façade and balconies of French embassies and consulates were sometimes decorated with quasi-heraldic emblems, such as a simple RF monogram or a lictor's fasces topped with a Phrygian cap. This was lamented by diplomats, as it neither reflected the country's rich heraldic tradition nor matched other European countries' emblems.

In 1881 Foreign Minister Charles de Freycinet sought to address this issue by proposing an arms. This first attempt was not successfully implemented. Count Horace de Choiseul, undersecretary of state in this department, invited the sculptor Francia to submit a project to him, which this denier executed on the drawing of Mr. Emile Bin.

1905–present: Adoption and modifications in external devices
King Alfonso XIII of Spain's official visit to France in 1905, as well as preceding visits from king Edward VII and Victor Emmanuel III of the United Kingdom and Italy, respectively, once again brought attention to the fact that France had no coat of arms. The Foreign Ministry responded by consulting the Grand Chancellery, which in turn asked the heraldists to propose national heraldic devices. Among about twenty proposals which were approved by the government, heraldic painter-engraver Maurice de Meyère's composition was formally adopted as the new coat of arms of France. This design was to be used by embassies and consulates abroad, instead of previous quasi-heraldic emblems.

In de Meyère's composition, the escutcheon was framed by an artistic console, whereas the Legion of Honour's star featured as the sole external heraldic device. The entire achievement was depicted upon an oval background with the words "French Republic" on the edge, a non-heraldic element. The console and oval background were mentioned as late as February 1914, but generally omitted after World War I, while the star of the Legion of Honour had been accompanied by the 1881 version of the grand collar.

In 1924/1925, a greater version of the arms was invented for a decorative tapestry commissioned by the city of Strasbourg to Gustave Louis Jaulmes. It has no actual use.

In 1953, the collar was redesigned.

Usage
A list of notable depictions:

1905: A watercolour reproducing de Meyère's design was sent to each member of the government, and the arms adorned the two entrances of the French foreign ministry (37 Quai d'Orsay) at the occasion of king Alfonso's visit.
1922: The arms was emblazoned on the bronze Medal for Fidelity to France, awarded to inhabitants of the two border regions of Alsace and Lorraine, who had been either imprisoned or exiled by the occupying Germans during World War I because of their loyalty to France.
1924/1925: A greater version of the arms was depicted on a painted tapestry by Gustave Louis Jaulmes, titled "Les armes de France". Commissioned by the city of Strasbourg, this piece was to be installed at the Commissariat General of the Republic in the city.
1928: German encyclopedias gave a color reproduction of Jaulmes' greater arms.
1929: On 10 May the German embassy in France inquired what was the official coat of arms of France was. The French Ministry of Foreign Affairs replied that "there is no, in principle, official coat of arms or emblem," but that such a composition was used for the French embassies and consulates.
1933-1942: The arms were depicted on prefects' uniforms.
1935: The annual edition of Le Petit Larousse reproduced a monochrome reproduction of the arms as a symbol of the French Republic.
1953: The United Nations Secretariat requested that France submit a national coat of arms that were to adorn the wall behind the podium in the General Assembly hall in New York, alongside the other member states' arms. On 3 June, an interministerial commission met at the Ministry of Foreign Affairs to select this emblem. It requested Robert Louis (1902–1965), heraldic artist, to produce a version of the Jules-Clément Chaplain design. In the end, Louis chose Maurice de Meyère's 1905 design instead, and this was adopted and submitted to the UN.
1975: President Valéry Giscard d'Estaing adopted the charge of the arms in his presidential standard.
6 June 1980: President d'Estaing assumed on him being admitted to the Order of the Seraphim: Azure a Fasces Or bindings Argent between two Laurel sprigs disposed orleways of the second and bound together in base by a ribbon of the third., based on the republican arms.
1982/1988: The arms were depicted on French space suits during the Franco-Soviet space missions of 1982 and 1988.
2009: Used to represent France in the Hanseatic Fountain in Veliky Novgorod, Russia.
The coat of arms is still used, e.g. in relation to presidential inaugurations, including that of François Mitterrand, Jacques Chirac and Emmanuel Macron in 1981, 1995 and 2017, respectively.

See also
Armorial of France
Armorial of the Capetian dynasty
National symbols of France
Symbolism in the French Revolution

References

External links

France at Heraldry of the World
Heraldry of France — Hubert de Vries website
Les Armes de Strasbourg — Collection du Mobilier national 
 http://www.languedoc-france.info/06141203_motto.htm
http://musee.sceaualsacien.pagesperso-orange.fr/heraldique.html
 http://svowebmaster.free.fr/blason_france.html
 Example
 Example
 Example 1955
Le Monde Illustre
L'Humanité
La Liberté
Bulletin / Société historique du Calaisis
Journal des débats politiques et littéraires
L'Intransigeant
La Petite Presse
Le Collectionneur de Timbres-Poste Journal
Gil Blas / dir. A. Dumont
La Croix, 7 June 1905
Le Grand écho du Nord et du Pas-de-Calais, 21 April 1905
Le Populaire de Paris, 26 June 1938
La Revue Diplomatique, 7 May 1905
Le Petit Oranais, 21 April 1905
Le Pays : journal des volontés de la France, 11 June 1905
Le Pays : journal des volontés de la France, 22 October 1919
Fleurs de lis in a republican context

France
France
France
France
France
French heraldry
France
France
National symbols of France